Paul Hughes is a former professional rugby league footballer who played in the 2000s.

References

External links
Stanley Rangers ARLFC - Roll of Honour

Dewsbury Rams players
Doncaster R.L.F.C. players
Featherstone Rovers players
Living people
Place of birth missing (living people)
Rugby league hookers
English rugby league players
Year of birth missing (living people)
York City Knights players